Crassispira maura, common name the dark-coloured pleurotoma, is a species of sea snail, a marine gastropod mollusk in the family Pseudomelatomidae.

Pleurotoma maura Kiener L.C., 1840 is a synonym of Pilsbryspira aterrima (Sowerby, G.B. I, 1834)

Description
The length of the shell varies between 45 mm and 85 mm.

The turreted shell is acuminated and blackish brown. The whorls are tuberculated in the middle, dotted round the lower part, whilst the upper part exhibits a depression from the rilling up of the sinus. The siphonal canal  is recurved.

The slender, acute shell is blackish brown with the anterior part of the body whorl pale reddish brown. It has a conspicuous periostracum and a closely appressed suture separated by a single cord from the constricted anal fascicle. It contains nine whorls, without the (lost) protoconch. The axial sculpture consists of (on the body whorl eight) prominent angular ribs with wider interspaces, beginning abruptly at the shoulder rapidly dwindling anteriorly and obsolete on the base. These ribs are crossed by (on the body whorl about 14) widely spaced slender cords, slightly nodulous at the intersections. The aperture is narrow. The anal sulcus is shallow. The outer lip is sharp, simple and with a slight subsutural callus. The inner lip is erased. The columella is straight. The siphonal canal is wide and very slightly recurved.

Distribution
This marine species occurs from Mazatlan, Mexico to Ecuador

References

 G.B. Sowberby I. Proc. Geol. Soc., 1833, p. 137
 Reeve, Conch. Syst., vol. ii. pi. 133. f. 4.

External links
 
 

maura
Gastropods described in 1834